Engineering Institute For Junior Executives, established in 1969,  is a government polytechnic located in Mahendra Bhattacharya Road, Dalalpukur,  Howrah, West Bengal. This polytechnic is affiliated to the West Bengal State Council of Technical Education,  and recognised by AICTE, New Delhi. This polytechnic offers diploma courses in electrical, electronics and telecommunication, mechanical and metallurgical engineering. Many MNC companies conduct campus placement from EIJE, Howrah. Companies like L&T, Vesuvius India Ltd, Jindal Steel & power Limited hire fresh engineers from this college. Apart from these MNC's, some West Bengal based engineering firms like Kiswoak, Vikrant Forge, Datre Corporation also offer campus selection.

History 
The institute began on 27 January 1969 with the name "Engineering Institute For Junior Executives" for the purpose of "training of technicians (foreman)" as per the then need of industry under a team comprising founder principal, Bhabani Prasad Sanyal and a few staff members and a few part-time faculty. A course L.M.E. (Licentiate Mechanical Engineering ), also called Sandwich Pattern, was started with annual intake capacity of 55 students. At that time, classes were held from 8 am to 2.30 pm, and second semester of each year was scheduled for industrial training. In May 1974, this institute received approval and sanctioned staff pattern and in September 1974, the Government. of West Bengal took over this institute. In July, 1991, the state government abolished the sandwich pattern course and introduced three year diploma courses as follows :

Mechanical Engineering – started in 1991
Electronics & Telecommunication Engineering –  started  in  1995
Electrical Engineering –  started in  2007
Metallurgical Engineering –  started  in  2008

All courses are approved by the "All India Council for Technical Education" and the "West Bengal State Council of Technical and Vocational Education and Skill Development" with intake capacity of 60 students in each stream.

Societies names:-
DMET:- Metal society (founded in 2017), society's are engaged in various development activities like, library facility for needy students. Smart & decorated class rooms. 
DME:- Mechanical society (founded in 2018)
DEE:- Electrical society (founded in 2019)
DETC:- Electronics society (founded in 2019)

Courses offered 
 Diploma in Mechanical engineering 
 Diploma in Electrical engineering 
 Diploma in Electronics and telecommunication
 Diploma in Metallurgical engineering

References

External links
 http://eijehowrah.org

Universities and colleges in Howrah district
Educational institutions established in 1969
1969 establishments in West Bengal
Technical universities and colleges in West Bengal